Kelvinside is a district in the Scottish city of Glasgow. It is situated north of the River Clyde and is bounded by Broomhill, Dowanhill and Hyndland to the south with Kelvindale and the River Kelvin to the north. It is an affluent area of Glasgow, with large Victorian villas and terraces.

As with Morningside, Edinburgh, residents are sometimes said to have a "pan loaf" accent, i.e. an affected one. This often leads to jokes about a "Kelvinsaide" accent. Both of these areas were featured in an advert for ScotRail.

Kelvinside railway station was on the Lanarkshire and Dunbartonshire Railway, but is now closed.

Kelvinside is home to Kelvinside Academy, a private school situated on the corner of Kirklee Road and Bellshaugh Road.

At the corner of Kirklee Road and Great Western Road is a shop called Churchill's. Churchill's began life as a green hut just a little bigger than an average-sized garage. It was known by locals as the "Greenie". In the 1990s it was replaced by a new two-storey stone building, with a flat in the upper floor and a shop on the ground floor. Although clad with brown stained wood, it is still referred to as the Greenie.

The local Church of Scotland parish churches (serving Kelvinside and parts of adjacent areas) are Kelvinside Hillhead Parish Church and St. John's Renfield Church. The local Roman Catholic church is St. Gregory's.

Notable buildings
Great Western Terrace, designed by Alexander "Greek" Thomson, is situated on Great Western Road. Westbourne Terrace, also designed by Thomson, is situated on Hyndland Road.

Notable people
Norman Stone, Scottish historian, author and professor

References

Areas of Glasgow